Negoiu River may refer to:

 Negoiu, a tributary of the Bistrița in Gorj County
 Negoi, a tributary of the Cerna in Hunedoara County
 Negoiu, a tributary of the Greci in Tulcea County
 Negoiu, a tributary of the Ilva in Mureș County

See also 
 Negoiu Peak
 Neagu River (disambiguation)
 Negovanu River